The Ukrainian Cup 1972 was a football knockout competition conducting by the Football Federation of Ukrainian SSR and was known as the Ukrainian Cup.

The Cup started with the preliminary round on November 4, 1972, and involved the republican level non-amateur clubs. The main event started from the round of 16 on November 8, 1972, when other clubs joined the competition such as Shakhtar, Chornomorets, Metalist, and others, while some of them represented by their second squad. Dynamo Kyiv has chosen not to participate in it since its last winning season in 1948. The competition concluded in just over two weeks in Kiev on November 19. Note that the tournament took place after the Soviet football season was over and was conducted in rather unsupported weather conditions as the cold period in Ukraine starts usually in September or October, depending on location.

Teams

Tournament distribution 
The competition was conducted among 21 Ukrainian clubs of the 1972 Soviet Second League, Zone 1 and all 5 Ukrainian clubs of the 1972 Soviet First League and FC Khimik Zhytomyr. Three more Ukrainian clubs of the Second League Lokomotyv Donetsk, Khimik Severodonetsk and Mayak Kharkiv did not participate.

Other professional teams 
The four Ukrainian professional teams in the Soviet Top League did not take part in the competition.
 1972 Soviet Top League (4): FC Dnipro Dnipropetrovsk, FC Dynamo Kyiv, FC Karpaty Lviv, FC Zorya Voroshylovhrad

Competition schedule

First elimination round 
November 4, 1972

|}

Replay (November 5)

|}

Second elimination round 
November 8, 1972

|}

Quarterfinals 
November 12, 1972

|}

Replay (November 13)

|}

Semifinals 

|}

Final 

|}

Avtomobilist: Zhurba, Kozynets, Bilyi, Kravchuk, Horbach, Pestrykov, Pinchuk, Sladkovskyi (Solovyov, 55), Vasiutyn, Nesmeyan (Kotov, 73), Zelenskyi 
Head coach: Lifshits
Shakhtar: Chanov, Yaremchenko, Kurhanov (Horbunov, 74), Belousov, Hubych, Kashchey, Vasin, Konkov, Prokopenko (Shevchuk, 68), Dudynskyi (Kliuchyk, 70), Safonov 
Head coach: Bazylevych

Top goalscorers

See also 
 Soviet Cup
 Ukrainian Cup

References

External links 
 Information source 
 The 1972 Cup of the Ukrainian SSR (1972. Кубок Української РСР). Luhansk Our Football.
 Как Шахтер упустил Кубок УССР. terrikon.com. 3 November 2017

1972
Cup
1972 domestic association football cups